Kelkin is an Irish healthy food company that provides healthy food products such as popcorn, peanut butter, cereal and vitamins. In recent years, the company has produced skincare products such as shampoos containing aloe vera or tea tree oil as the main ingredient.

References

Food and drink companies of Ireland
Food and drink companies established in 1977
Manufacturing companies based in Dublin (city)